Vasiliy Lomachenko vs. Masayoshi Nakatani was a lightweight professional boxing match contested between three-division former unified lightweight world champion Vasiliy Lomachenko, and lightweight contender Masayoshi Nakatani. The bout took place on June 26, 2021, at the Virgin Hotels Las Vegas in Paradise, Nevada. Lomachenko won the fight by ninth-round technical knockout.

Background 
The pair share a common loss to Teófimo López. Lomachenko lost his unified titles to the American in October 2020, while Nakatani had also lost a unanimous decision to López in July 2019. Lomachenko cited that he "still wanted to be undisputed lightweight champion". However, López declined to give Lomachenko a rematch, explaining that “everybody [in Lomachenko’s camp] was being a dick to me, my father. He [Lomachenko] didn’t want to put a rematch clause in our contract." Speaking on why he chose Nakatani as his next opponent, Lomachenko said "I want to compare myself with this guy, he was close with [López] in their fight."

Nakatani fought back from his loss to López, beating Félix Verdejo via technical knockout, after being dropped for the first time in his professional career.

Lomachenko agreed to a comeback fight against Nakatani in Las Vegas. The bout was aired on ESPN+ in the US and Sky Sports in the UK and Ireland. It went head to head with Gervonta Davis' light welterweight clash with Mario Barrios on Showtime PPV in Atlanta, Georgia taking place on the same night. The fight was only the second time in Lomachenko's professional career that a world title was not on the line.

Fight details 
Lomachenko reasserted himself as one of the best at lightweight, as the former pound-for-pound star dropped Nakatani in the fifth, before stopping him in round nine. CompuBox stats show that Lomachenko landed 104 out of 214 punches (49%), while Nakatani landed 29 out of 250 (12%).

With the victory, Lomachenko earned the right to a potential rematch with López, a reward he has made no secret that he desperately seeks. "He has a fight in the future with [George] Kambosos, but after [we will fight]," Lomachenko said. "Maybe next year, beginning of the year. December, January, February. I am waiting." Lomachenko added: "Everybody saw how I won this fight, and everybody is waiting for the rematch, so let's make a rematch."

Fight card

Broadcasting

References 

Boxing matches
2021 in boxing
June 2021 sports events in the United States